Kusaj-e Olya (also Romanized as Kūsaj-e ‘Olyā) is a village in Anguran Rural District, Anguran District, Mahneshan County, Zanjan Province, Iran. At the 2006 census, its population was 400, in 66 families.

References 

Populated places in Mahneshan County